Vladimir Sergeevich Samoilov (born 13 May 1999) is a Russian figure skater who currently represents Poland. He is the 2022 Bavarian Open champion, the 2022 Volvo Open Cup champion, and the 2022 Polish national champion.

Competing for Russia, he is the 2017 JGP Italy silver medalist.

Personal life 
Samoilov was born on 13 May 1999 in Moscow, Russia. He has an older sister, Katerina, who coaches figure skating.

Career

Early career
Samoilov began skating in 2003 at CSKA Sports School in Moscow under coach Irina Galustyan. He remained with Galustyan until 2009, after which he changed coaches several times, moving to Elena Sokolova for the 2009–2010 season, Anastasia Timofeeva for the 2010–2011 season, and Irina Smirnova for the summer of 2011. In December 2011, he moved back to CSKA to train under Inna Goncharenko.

His time with Goncharenko lasted until the 2016–2017 season, after which he moved to Sambo 70 to train under Eteri Tutberidze, Sergei Dudakov, and Daniil Gleikhengauz. Samoilov was only in Tutberidze's camp for one season with little success due to a back injury he incurred there, which prevented him from training normally. He contemplated retiring from competition before he eventually moved to Evgeni Plushenko's new Academy Angels of Plushenko in August 2017.

2017–18 season
After four years of competition on the ISU Junior Grand Prix circuit, Samoilov earned his first JGP medal in October 2017 at JGP Italy in Egna-Neumarkt. Samoilov won the short program with a score of 77.65 but was third in the free program after a series of falls. He won the silver medal behind Italian skater Matteo Rizzo and ahead of bronze medalist, American Tomoki Hiwatashi.

Samoilov competed next at 2017 Minsk-Arena Ice Star, where he placed first in the junior men's division by a margin of almost 20 points over silver medalist Irakli Maysuradze. He attempted three quadruple jumps in the free program, including one in combination, and successfully completed two.

At the 2018 Russian Figure Skating Championships, Samoilov had his best career finish at the event at the senior level, placing sixth overall – a major improvement over his 17th-place finish the year before. As a result of his placement at the event, Samoilov was named onto the Russian senior men's national reserve team for the 2018–2019 season.

2018–19 season
Samoilov departed Plushenko's training camp in the summer before the start of the 2018–19 season, following assistant coaches Alexei Vasilevsky and Yulia Lavrenchuk to their new program. He only competed domestically this season, finishing 11th at the 2019 Russian Figure Skating Championships.

2019–20 season
Samoilov again changed coaches before the start of the 2019–20 season, this time moving to train under Viktoria Butsaeva. Under Butsaeva, Samoilov appeared to strengthen his jumps, demonstrating the ability to perform all five different types of quad jumps (4T, 4S, 4Lo, 4F, and 4Lz), as well as difficult combinations such as the triple Axel-triple loop. He again qualified to the 2020 Russian Figure Skating Championships through the domestic Cup of Russia system but was only able to finish 15th overall after a disastrous short program left him initially in 17th place.

2020–21 season: End of career for Russia 
Samoilov did not compete during the 2020–21 figure skating season but continued to train under Butsaeva. During the season, he displayed impressive jumping feats on social media, including quad Salchow-Euler-quad Salchow and quad Lutz-Euler-quad Salchow combinations. On 18 May 2021, Russian media outlets began reporting that Samoilov had put in a request with the Russian Figure Skating Federation for a transfer to represent Poland. Samoilov confirmed the transition in an interview with Sport-Express.ru. The transfer process, in actuality, began in 2019.

2021–22 season: Debut for Poland 
Due to his transfer to represent Poland, Samoilov was banned from training in Russia by the Russian Figure Skating Federation and was forced to leave coach Viktoria Butsaeva. He began training in Egna, Italy, with coaches Lorenzo Magri and Angelina Turenko in October 2021. He was scheduled to make his domestic debut representing Poland at the Federation's season-opening event in early September but withdrew before the start of the competition because of inadequate preparation time. He later received his first international assignment for Poland, the 2021 CS Golden Spin of Zagreb, replacing French skater Adam Siao Him Fa after he withdrew from the event. In Zagreb, Samoilov placed 15th in the short program after falling on a downgraded triple Axel attempt. His struggles continued in the free skate, where he fell to 21st in the segment and eighteenth overall.

The following weekend, Samoilov won his first Polish national title at the 2022 Four National Championships. He placed fourth in the short program due to a fall on a downgraded planned quad Salchow and a popped triple Axel attempt but climbed to second in the free skate by skating a mostly clean program of triple jumps. He placed third in the overall event behind Czech skaters Matyáš Bělohradský and Georgii Reshtenko but finished first of the Polish entrants. Despite his win, Samoilov was only named as first alternate to the Polish men's berth at the 2022 European Championships, with Kornel Witkowski receiving the assignment.

Samoilov next competed at the 2022 Bavarian Open in January. He placed third in the short program after popping his planned quad Salchow to an invalid double but climbed to first in the free skate to take the title ahead of Austria's Luc Maierhofer and Kai Jagoda of Germany.

Samoilov was assigned to Poland's berth in the men's event at the 2022 World Championships in Montpellier in late March. He popped a planned triple Axel into a single in the short program and later fell during his step sequence. He scored 60.71 and did not advance to the free skate, finishing in twenty-seventh place.

2022–23 season
Samoilov appeared three times on the Challenger circuit, coming seventh at the 2022 CS Budapest Trophy, sixth at the 2022 CS Nepela Memorial, and seventh at the 2022 CS Warsaw Cup. He finished first among all skaters at the 2023 Four National Championships, earning a second Polish title.

Making his debut at the European Championships, Samoilov finished sixth in the short program, in the process setting a new personal best of 78.26. He dropped to seventeenth after the free skate.

Programs

Competitive highlights 
CS: Challenger Series; JGP: Junior Grand Prix

For Poland

For Russia

Detailed results

For Poland

For Russia

References

1999 births
Russian male single skaters
Polish male single skaters
Figure skaters from Moscow
Living people